John Amadas (by 1489 – 1554 or 1555), of Court Gate, Tavistock, Devon, Eltham, Kent and Launceston, Cornwall, was an English politician.

He was a Member (MP) of the Parliament of England for Tavistock in 1515. He was Mayor of Launceston in 1544–45.

References

15th-century births
1555 deaths
Members of the Parliament of England for Tavistock
People from Kent
People from Launceston, Cornwall
Mayors of places in Cornwall
English MPs 1515